The Charlton County Courthouse is located in Folkston, Georgia.  It is in the Neoclassical style and was constructed in 1928 out of brick, stone, and concrete.  The construction cost was $46,000 and the clock cost and additional $3,000.  The total cost of the project was $54,000.  It is the fourth courthouse built for this county and is built on the site of the previous courthouse, which was built in 1902 and burned in 1928.

The building was added to the National Register of Historic Places in 1980.

References

External links
 

Courthouses on the National Register of Historic Places in Georgia (U.S. state)
National Register of Historic Places in Charlton County, Georgia
Neoclassical architecture in Georgia (U.S. state)
Government buildings completed in 1928
Buildings and structures in Charlton County, Georgia
County courthouses in Georgia (U.S. state)